A civilian subject to service discipline is someone who, whilst not a member of the British Armed Forces, is nevertheless subject to some aspects of British military law and the military justice system.

Categories 

The Armed Forces Act 2006 defines who is a civilian subject to service discipline. The main categories are:
 civilians on board a military ship when afloat, or on board a military aircraft when in flight
 civil servants working in support of the armed forces, when in a designated area (see below)
 civilians employed by NATO by reason of the United Kingdom's membership of NATO, when outside the British Islands
 civilians employed by certain support organisations, when in a designated area
 The Navy, Army and Air Force Institutes (NAAFI)
 Service Children's Education
 The Services Sound and Vision Corporation (SSVC)
 The Soldiers, Sailors, Airmen and Families Association - Forces Help
 civilians living with or staying with a service person or other civilian subject to service discipline, when in a designated area
 others designated by the Defence Council, for example contractors deployed on operations

Designated areas 

The following countries are designated areas in respect of civil servants, employees of support organizations and civilians living with or staying with either of those:
 Brunei Darussalam
 Falkland Islands
 Germany
 Gibraltar
 Saudi Arabia
 Afghanistan
 Iraq

The following countries are designated areas in respect of civilians living with or staying with a service person:
 Belize
 Brunei Darussalam
 Falkland Islands
 Germany
 Gibraltar
 Saudi Arabia
 Cyprus
 Turkey
 The Sovereign Base Areas of Akrotiri and Dhekelia
 Kuwait
 Oman

These definitions will therefore include, for example, family members living with a soldier stationed in Germany.

Civilians subject to service discipline may be tried in the Service Civilian Court or by the Court Martial (although the Court Martial will be made up of civilian, not military, members).

Comparison with other countries 

The list of civilians who are subject to service discipline is more extensive than in some other countries—for example, in the United States, civilian spouses, dependents, and guests of military personnel are not included in the list of people subject to that country's Uniform Code of Military Justice.

See also 
 Offences against military law in the United Kingdom

References 

United Kingdom military law